My Uncle Barbassous (Italian:Mio zio Barbassous) is a 1921 Italian silent film directed by Riccardo Cassano and starring Carmen Boni.

Cast
 Carmen Boni 
 Nino Camarda 
 Myosa De Coudray 
 Elena Sangro

References

Bibliography
 Stewart, John. Italian film: a who's who. McFarland, 1994.

External links

1921 films
1920s Italian-language films
Italian silent feature films
Italian black-and-white films